Vlassov is a surname. Notable people with the surname include:

Alexander Vlassov (born 1955), Soviet pair skater
Julia Vlassov (born 1990), American pair skater
Viktor Vlassov (born 1951), Soviet sport shooter

See also
Vlasov